Stefania Tarenzi (born 29 February 1988) is an Italian professional footballer who plays as a striker for Serie A club Sampdoria and the Italy women's national team.

References

External links

Football.it profile

1988 births
Living people
Italian women's footballers
Serie A (women's football) players
A.C.F. Brescia Calcio Femminile players
U.S. Sassuolo Calcio (women) players
Inter Milan (women) players
Women's association football forwards
2019 FIFA Women's World Cup players
Italy women's international footballers
U.C. Sampdoria (women) players